Raid 2020 (working title Drug Czar[citation needed]) is a cyberpunk action video game for the Nintendo Entertainment System. This game was released only in North America and Australia. The game's style was largely inspired by Blade Runner and the cyberpunk genre for its aesthetics, world and style.

Gameplay
The object is to defeat all the drug dealers, defeat the drug lord Pit Bull, and eradicate drugs from the streets of America. As agent Shadow, the player faces a dystopian future world where moral collapse is inevitable. He is described as representing the last uncorrupted vestiges of law enforcement.

See also
 NARC - a video game with the same premise

References

1989 video games
Nintendo Entertainment System games
Nintendo Entertainment System-only games
Unauthorized video games
Cyberpunk video games
Dystopian video games
Video games about the illegal drug trade
Video games about police officers
Video games set in the United States
Video games set in 2020
Color Dreams games
Video games developed in the United States
Neo-noir video games

Single-player video games